"Missing You" is a song by British Contemporary R&B band Soul II Soul, released in November 1990 as the fourth and last single from their second album, Vol. II: 1990 – A New Decade (1990). It features American singer-songwriter Kym Mazelle and was a top 30 hit in Ireland and the UK. Outside Europe, it peaked at number nine in Zimbabwe, number 39 on the Billboard Dance Club Songs chart in the US and number 166 in Australia. A black-and-white music video was produced to promote the single. It shows Mazelle and Jazzie B dancing together on a dancefloor while performing it.

Critical reception
Alex Henderson from AllMusic described "Missing You" as a "sleek urban/dance/neo-soul groove". Bill Coleman from Billboard named it one of the "special moments" from the album. Another editor, Larry Flick, found that it places guest diva Kym Mazelle within a down-tempo R&B/house groove, saying, "A tad slow for peak-hour play, but just perfect for early-a.m. sets." Ernest Hardy from Cashbox complimented the chorus of the song. Pan-European magazine Music & Media felt that it's "somewhat similar" to their 1989 hit "Keep On Movin'", noting further that this is "another strong contender from the masters of club music." 

Selina Webb from Music Week called it "a safe bet", complimenting Mazelle's "strident soul vocal and loads of sophisticated groove techniques." She added that "this will chart highly". Paolo Hewitt from NME remarked that "House chanteuse" Kym Mazelle "hits the highs" on the track. A reviewer from People Magazine named it one of the "winners" of the album, on which Mazelle "gets to belt it out". Tom Doyle from Smash Hits described it as an "ace tune", that sounds "a bit" like "Keep On Movin'". He concluded that it "definitely deserves to be a single".

Track listing
 12" single (Remix), UK & Europe (1990)
"Missing You" (Remake) – 6:36
"Missing You" (Blow Mr Hornsman Blow Mix) – 6:34
"Missing You" (Thumpin' Bass Mix) – 5:32
               
 CD single, UK (1990)
"Missing You" (The Healer Mix) – 4:53
"Missing You" (The Thumpin' Bass Mix) – 4:48
"Missing You" (Album Version) – 5:24
"People" (Club Mix) – 4:51                   

 CD maxi, Japan (1991)
"Missing You" (Thumpin' Bass Mix) – 4:47
"Missing You" (The Healer Instrumental) – 5:04
"Missing You" (Humanity Mix) – 5:09
"Jazzie's Groove" (Jazzie's 12") – 5:05

Charts

References

1990 singles
1990 songs
Soul II Soul songs
Songs written by Jazzie B
Songs written by Simon Law
Song recordings produced by Nellee Hooper
Virgin Records singles
Black-and-white music videos